This article shows the roster of all participating teams at the 2022 FIVB Volleyball Men's Nations League.

The following is Argentina's roster in the 2022 Men's Nations League.

Head coach:  Marcelo Méndez

 
1 Matías Sánchez 
2 Tobias Scarpa 
3 Jan Martínez Franchi 
4 Joaquin Gallego 
5 Pablo Urchevich 
6 Federico Martina 
8 Agustín Loser 
9 Santiago Danani 
10 Nicolás Lazo 
11 Manuel Armoa 
12 Bruno Lima 
13 Ezequiel Palacios 
14 Nicolás Méndez 
15 Luciano De Cecco 
16 Luciano Palonsky 
17 Luciano Vicentín 
18 Martín Ramos 
19 Franco Massimino 
20 Mauro Zelayeta 
22 Nicolás Zerba 
23 Flavio Rajczakowski  
24 Manuel Balagué 
66 Franco Medina 
77 Matias Giraudo

The following is Australia's roster in the 2022 Men's Nations League.

Head coach:  Dave Preston

1 Beau Graham 
2 Arshdeep Dosanjh 
3 Lorenzo Pope 
4 Jackson Holland 
5 Malachi Murch 
6 Thomas Edgar 
7 James Weir 
8 Trent O'Dea 
9 Max Staples 
10 Nicolas Borgeaud 
11 Luke Perry 
12 Nehemiah Mote 
13 Thomas Heptinstall 
14 Hamish Hazelden 
15 Conal McAinsh 
17 Korben Phillips 
18 Lincoln Williams 
19 William D'Arcy 
21 Nicholas Butler 
23 Sam Flowerday 
26 Dimitri Sidiropoulos 
27 Max Senica 
29 Ethan Garrett 
31 Matthew Aubrey 
33 Lachlan Bray

The following is Brazil's roster in the 2022 Men's Nations League.

Head coach:  Renan Dal Zotto

1 Bruno Rezende 
2 Leonardo Andrade 
3 João Rafael Ferreira 
4 Franco Paese 
5 Matheus Gonçalves 
6 Adriano Fernandes 
9 Yoandy Leal 
10 Matheus Santos 
11 Rodrigo Leão 
12 Isac Santos 
13 Gabriel Kavalkievicz 
14 Fernando Kreling 
15 Maique Nascimento 
16 Lucas Saatkamp 
17 Thales Hoss 
18 Ricardo Lucarelli 
19 Leandro Santos 
20 Henrique Honorato 
21 Alan Souza 
22 Alexandre Elias 
23 Flávio Gualberto 
25 Victor Cardoso 
28 Darlan Souza

The following is Bulgaria's roster in the 2022 Men's Nations League.

Head coach:  Nikolay Jeliazkov

1 Denis Karyagin 
2 Stefan Chavdarov 
3 Nikolay Kolev 
4 Martin Atanasov 
5 Svetoslav Gotsev 
6 Vladimir Stankov 
7 Dobromir Dimitrov 
9 Georgi Seganov 
10 Svetoslav Stankov 
11 Aleks Grozdanov 
12 Georgi Tatarov 
13 Dimitar Dimitrov 
14 Asparuh Asparuhov 
15 Radoslav Parapunov 
16 Vladislav Ivanov 
17 Samuil Valchinov 
18 Svetoslav Ivanov 
20 Ventsislav Ragin 
21 Iliya Petkov 
22 Nikolay Kartev 
23 Aleksandar Nikolov 
24 Martin Ivanov 
25 Venislav Antov 
26 Nikolay Zahariev 
27 Martin Bozhilov

The following is Canada's roster in the 2022 Men's Nations League.

Head coach:  Ben Josephson

1 Jordan Canham 
2 Matthew Neaves 
3 Jesse Elser 
4 Nicholas Hoag 
5 Eric Loeppky 
6 Danny Demyanenko 
7 Stephen Maar 
8 Brett Walsh 
9 Jay Blankenau 
10 Ryan Sclater 
11 Pearson Eshenko 
12 Lucas Van Berkel 
13 Max Elgert 
14 Xander Ketrzynski 
15 Marc Wilson 
16 Jordan Schnitzer 
17 Ryley Barnes 
18 Justin Lui 
19 Brodie Hofer 
20 Derek Epp 
21 Jackson Howe 
22 Brandon Koppers 
23 Fynnian McCarthy 
24 Mathias Elser 
25 Samuel Cooper

The following is China's roster in the 2022 Men's Nations League.

Head coach:  Wu Sheng

1 Dai Qingyao 
2 Jiang Chuan 
3 Qu Zongshuai 
4 Yang Yiming 
5 Zhang Binglong 
6 Yu Yuantai 
7 Yu Yaochen 
8 Yang Tianyuan 
9 Li Yongzhen 
10 Liu Meng 
11 Jiang Zhengyang 
12 Zhang Zhejia 
13 Chen Leiyang 
14 Wang Dongchen 
15 Peng Shikun 
16 Wang Hebin 
17 Wang Jingyi 
18 Yuan Dangyi 
19 Zhang Guanhua 
20 Dai Haibo 
21 Miao Ruantong 
22 Zhang Jingyin 
23 Wu Pengzhi 
24 Qi Jiahao 
25 Zhai Dejun

The following is the France's roster in the 2022 Men's Nations League.

Head coach:  Andrea Giani

1 Barthélémy Chinenyeze 
2 Jenia Grebennikov 
3 Raphael Corre 
4 Jean Patry 
5 Jeremie Mouiel 
6 Benjamin Toniutti 
7 Kévin Tillie 
9 Earvin N'Gapeth 
11 Antoine Brizard 
12 Stéphen Boyer 
13 Luca Ramon 
14 Nicolas Le Goff 
15 Médéric Henry 
16 Daryl Bultor 
17 Trévor Clévenot 
19 Yacine Louati 
20 Benjamin Diez 
21 Théo Faure 
22 Pierre Derouillon 
23 Luka Basic 
24 Moussé Gueye 
25 Quentin Jouffroy 
26 François Rebeyrol 
27 Ibrahim Lawani 
28 Gill Thomas

The following is Germany's roster in the 2022 Men's Nations League.

Head coach:  Michał Winiarski

1 Christian Fromm 
2 Johannes Tille 
3 Ruben Schott 
4 Leonard Graven 
5 Moritz Reichert 
10 Julian Zenger 
11 Lukas Kampa 
14 Moritz Karlitzek 
15 Franz Hüther 
16 Eric Burggräf 
17 Jan Zimmermann 
18 Florian Krage 
19 Erik Röhrs  
20 Linus Weber 
21 Tobias Krick 
22 Tobias Brand 
23 Yannick Goralik 
24 Daniel Malescha 
25 Lukas Maase 
27 Moritz Eckardt 
29 Leon Dervisaj 
32 Iven Ferch 
38 Tim Peter 
40 Max Schulz 
44 Simon Gallas

The following is Iran's roster in the 2022 Men's Nations League.

Head coach:  Behrouz Ataei

1 Mahdi Jelveh 
2 Milad Ebadipour 
3 Reza Abedini 
5 Amir Hossein Toukhteh 
7 Esmaeil Mosafer 
8 Mohammad Reza Hazratpour 
9 Mohammad Reza Moazzen 
11 Saber Kazemi 
12 Mojtaba Mirzajanpour 
13 Ali Ramezani 
14 Meisam Salehi 
15 Aliasghar Mojarad 
16 Abolfazl Gholipour 
17 Amin Esmaeilnejad 
18 Mohammad Taher Vadi 
19 Ehsan Daneshdoust 
20 Porya Yali 
21 Amir Reza Sarlak 
22 Amirhossein Esfandiar 
23 Bardia Saadat 
24 Javad Karimi 
25 Fazel Pazhooman 
26 Mehrab Malakisorkhi 
30 Amirhassan Fahradi 
49 Morteza Sharifi

The following is Italy's roster in the 2022 Men's Nations League.

Head coach:  Ferdinando De Giorgi

1 Giulio Pinali 
2 Fabio Ricci 
3 Francesco Recine 
4 Oreste Cavuto 
5 Alessandro Michieletto 
6 Simone Giannelli 
7 Fabio Balaso 
8 Riccardo Sbertoli 
9 Ivan Zaytsev 
10 Marco Falaschi 
11 Davide Gardini 
12 Mattia Bottolo 
13 Lorenzo Cortesia 
14 Gianluca Galassi 
15 Daniele Lavia 
16 Yuri Romanò 
17 Simone Anzani 
18 Fabrizio Gironi 
19 Roberto Russo 
20 Paolo Porro 
21 Alessandro Piccinelli 
22 Tommaso Stefani 
24 Leonardo Scanferla 
25 Marco Vitelli 
30 Leandro Mosca

The following is Japan's roster in the 2022 Men's Nations League.

Head coach:  Philippe Blain

1 Yuji Nishida 
2 Taishi Onodera 
3 Akihiro Fukatsu 
4 Issei Otake 
5 Tatsunori Otsuka 
6 Akihiro Yamauchi 
7 Kenta Takanashi 
8 Masahiro Sekita 
9 Masaki Oya 
10 Kentaro Takahashi 
11 Shoma Tomita 
12 Ran Takahashi 
13 Tomohiro Ogawa 
14 Yuki Ishikawa 
16 Kento Miyaura 
17 Akito Yamazaki 
18  
20 Tomohiro Yamamoto 
21  
22  
24 Kazuyuki Takahashi 
26 Go Murayama 
30 Larry Evbade-Dan 
34 Masato Kai 
36 Yuichiro Komiya

The following is Netherlands' roster in the 2022 Men's Nations League.

Head coach:  Roberto Piazza

1 Markus Held 
2 Wessel Keemink 
3 Maarten van Garderen 
4 Thijs ter Horst 
5 Luuc van der Ent 
6 Jasper Wijkstra 
7 Gijs Jorna 
8 Fabian Plak 
9 Steven Ottevanger 
10 Stijn van Tilburg 
11 Martijn Brilhuis 
12 Bennie Tuinstra 
13 Mats Bleeker 
14 Nimir Abdel-Aziz 
15 Gijs van Solkema 
17 Michael Parkinson 
18 Robbert Andringa 
19 Freek de Weijer 
20 Yannick Bak 
21 Joris Berkhout 
22 Twan Wiltenburg 
23 Robin Boekhoudt 
24 Ricardo Hofman 
25 Siebe Korenblek 
26 Sil Meijs

The following is Poland's roster in the 2022 Men's Nations League.

Head coach:  Nikola Grbić

1 Bartłomiej Lipiński 
2 Maciej Muzaj 
3 Jakub Popiwczak 
4 Łukasz Kozub 
5 Łukasz Kaczmarek 
6 Bartosz Kurek 
7 Karol Kłos 
10 Bartosz Bednorz 
12 Grzegorz Łomacz 
13 Rafał Szymura 
14 Aleksander Śliwka 
15 Jakub Kochanowski 
16 Kamil Semeniuk 
17 Paweł Zatorski 
18 Bartosz Kwolek 
19 Marcin Janusz 
20 Mateusz Bieniek 
21 Tomasz Fornal 
22 Karol Urbanowicz 
23 Karol Butryn 
24 Kamil Szymura 
72 Mateusz Poręba 
96 Jan Firlej

The following is Serbia's roster in the 2022 Men's Nations League.

Head coach:  Igor Kolaković

1 Uroš Nikolić 
4 Nemanja Petrić 
5 Milan Katić 
6 Nikola Peković 
7 Petar Krsmanović 
8 Marko Ivović 
9 Nikola Jovović 
10 Miran Kujundžić 
12 Pavle Perić 
14 Aleksandar Atanasijević 
15 Nemanja Mašulović 
18 Marko Podraščanin 
20 Srećko Lisinac 
21 Vuk Todorović 
22 Andrija Vilimanović 
23 Božidar Vučićević 
25 Luka Tadić 
28 Lazar Marinović 
29 Aleksandar Nedeljković 
30 Lazar Koprivica 
32 Nikola Meljanac 
33 Dušan Petković 
35 Andrej Rudić 
39 Andrija Vulikić 
40 Miljan Milović

The following is Slovenia's roster in the 2022 Men's Nations League.

Head coach:  Mark Lebedew

1 Tonček Štern 
2 Alen Pajenk 
3 Uroš Planinšič 
4 Jan Kozamernik 
5 Alen Šket 
6 Mitja Gasparini 
7 Alan Košenina 
8 Crtomir Bošnjak 
9 Dejan Vinčić 
10 Sašo Štalekar 
11 Danijel Koncilja 
12 Jan Klobučar 
13 Jani Kovačič 
14 Žiga Štern 
15 Matic Videčnik 
16 Gregor Ropret 
17 Tine Urnaut 
18 Klemen Čebulj 
19 Rok Možič 
20 Nik Mujanović 
21 Gregor Pernuš 
22 Janž Kržič 
23 Jure Okroglič

The following is USA's roster in the 2022 Men's Nations League.

Head coach:  John Speraw

2 Aaron Russell 
3 James Shaw 
4 Jeffrey Jendryk 
5 Kyle Ensing 
6 Mitchell Stahl 
7 Jacob Pasteur 
8 Torey DeFalco 
9 Jake Hanes 
10 Kyle Dagostino 
11 Micah Christenson 
13 Patrick Gasman 
14 Quinn Isaacson 
15 Kyle Russell 
16 Joshua Tuaniga 
17 Thomas Jaeschke 
18 Garrett Muagututia 
20 David Smith 
21 Mason Briggs 
22 Erik Shoji 
23 Cody Kessel 
24 Brett Wildman 
25 William Rottman 
26 Merrick McHenry 
27 Tyler Mitchem 
31 Spencer Olivier

References

External links
FIVB Volleyball Nations League 2022 – official website

FIVB Volleyball Men's Nations League
2022
2022 in men's volleyball